Agia Paraskevi is a village located in the southeast of the peninsula of Kassandra, in Chalkidiki, northern Greece. The population of the village of Agia Paraskevi was 294 in 2011, while the population of the community, which includes the village Loutra, was 375. It is located 4 km south of Pefkochori, 5 km west Paliouri, 7 km east of Nea Skioni and about 100 km southeast of Thessaloniki.

Population

External links
Agia Paraskevi & Loutra on www.kassandra-halkidiki.gr
Agia Paraskevi on Greek Travel Pages
KTEL Bus service routes to/from Agia Paraskevi

See also

List of settlements in Chalkidiki

References

Populated places in Chalkidiki